Carabus maurus maurus is a subspecies of beetle from the family Carabidae, found in Armenia, Georgia, and Turkey. The species are black coloured.

References

maurus maurus
Beetles described in 1817
Beetles of Asia